North San Pedro is a census-designated place (CDP) in Nueces County, Texas, United States. The population was 895 at the 2010 census, down from 920 at the 2000 census.

Geography
North San Pedro is located at  (27.802670, -97.682970).

Demographics
As of the census of 2000, there were 920 people, 257 households, and 219 families residing in the CDP. The population density was 9,025.6 people per square mile (3,552.1/km2). There were 290 housing units at an average density of 2,845.0/sq mi (1,119.7/km2). The racial makeup of the CDP was 62.61% White, 0.98% Native American, 32.39% from other races, and 4.02% from two or more races. Hispanic or Latino of any race were 98.70% of the population.

There were 257 households, out of which 40.1% had children under the age of 18 living with them, 58.0% were married couples living together, 20.6% had a female householder with no husband present, and 14.4% were non-families. 11.7% of all households were made up of individuals, and 5.8% had someone living alone who was 65 years of age or older. The average household size was 3.58 and the average family size was 3.89.

In the CDP, the population was spread out, with 33.5% under the age of 18, 12.4% from 18 to 24, 24.8% from 25 to 44, 18.2% from 45 to 64, and 11.2% who were 65 years of age or older. The median age was 28 years. For every 100 females, there were 91.3 males. For every 100 females age 18 and over, there were 91.8 males.

The median income for a household in the CDP was $21,797, and the median income for a family was $22,440. Males had a median income of $18,875 versus $10,893 for females. The per capita income for the CDP was $12,423. About 28.9% of families and 27.5% of the population were below the poverty line, including 33.1% of those under age 18 and 39.6% of those age 65 or over.

References

Census-designated places in Nueces County, Texas
Census-designated places in Texas
Corpus Christi metropolitan area